Ragnhild Sælthun Fjørtoft  (born 9 June 1947) is a Norwegian former television presenter.

She was born in Lærdal to farmer Olaf Sælthun and politician Ambjørg Sælthun, and is married to Arne Fjørtoft .

She was assigned with NRK for 45 years, from 1969 to 2014. She was awarded  in 1994,  in 2004, the Gullruten honorary award in 2006, and the King's Medal of Merit in 2014.

References

1947 births
Living people
People from Lærdal
Norwegian television presenters
Norwegian women television presenters
NRK people
Spouses of Norwegian politicians